Spring Equinox: Moon's Milk or Under an Unquiet Skull is part one of the four part Seasons collective created by Coil.

Release history
A first edition, released on spring equinox 1998, consisted of a limited 7" of 1000 copies on milky white vinyl and 55 copies on yellow vinyl and a CD-EP, which was deleted on summer solstice, when the second part was released. On the summer solstice of 2001 a second edition of the CD-EP was released, limited to 400 copies.

All four Solstice/Equinox releases have been compiled in a two-CD set entitled Moons Milk (In Four Phases). This CD will again be re-released on Moon's Milk In Six Phases.

Track 1 consists of mainly organ, whereas track 2 seems to use the same organ exactly with some added viola played by William Breeze.

Track listing
"Moon's Milk or Under an Unquiet Skull (Part 1)"  – 8:32
"Moon's Milk or Under an Unquiet Skull (Part 2)"  – 8:10

References

External links
 
 
 Spring Equinox: Moon's Milk or Under an Unquiet Skull at Brainwashed

1998 EPs
Coil (band) EPs